Araux (Araus in Occitan) is a commune in the Pyrénées-Atlantiques department in southwestern France.

Geography

Location

This commune is located roughly midway between Sauveterre-de-Béarn to the northwest and Navarrenx to the south-east.

Access

Araux is accessed by departmental roads 836 and 936.

Waterways

Araux lies in the Adour watershed. The Gave d'Oloron (a tributary of the Gave de Pau) and the Lausset, a tributary, flow through the commune.  The Cassou dou Boue and the Lescuncette stream, both tributaries of the Harcellane stream (itself a tributary of the Lausset), also pass through the commune.

Toponymy

Araux has also been referred to as Araus (

See also
Communes of the Pyrénées-Atlantiques department

References

Communes of Pyrénées-Atlantiques